The Lorentz River (also Unir or Undir in Indonesian, or Noordrivier in Dutch) is located in the Indonesian province of South Papua in Western New Guinea, about 3,500 km northeast of the Indonesian capital Jakarta. It originates in the central east-west mountain range of New Guinea, and flows southwards into the Arafura Sea at Flamingo Bay. During the first two Dutch expeditions to Southern New Guinea (1907–10) it was called Northern River. In 1910 it was renamed after the Dutch explorer Hendrikus Albertus Lorentz. After it became part of Indonesia, it was renamed to Unir, as in the language of the local Asmat people, while the Lorentz name is still in use.

History 
At the beginning of the 20th century the navigable part of the river played an important role in the exploration of Dutch New Guinea in western New Guinea. Three large Dutch expeditions led from the mouth upstream to the central snow-capped mountains, which were still unexplored. The aim of the expeditions was to cover the Wilhelmina summit (now called Puncak Trikora ) covered by "eternal snow" . The first of the three South New Guinea expeditions failed before the mountain could be reached. The second expedition reached the snow-capped foot of Wilhelmina, but it was only during the third expedition that the mountain could be conquered on 21 February 1913.

Geography
The river flows in the southwest area of Papua with predominantly tropical rainforest climate (designated as Af in the Köppen-Geiger climate classification). The annual average temperature in the area is 21 °C. The warmest month is October, when the average temperature is around 23 °C, and the coldest is July, at 20 °C. The average annual rainfall is 4,238-5,547 mm. The wettest month is May, with an average of 594 mm rainfall, and the driest is July, with 384 mm rainfall.

See also
List of rivers of Indonesia
List of rivers of Western New Guinea

References

External links
 Map and pictures of Lorentz River from The Papua Insects Foundation.

Rivers of Papua (province)
Rivers of Indonesia